Creigiau Gleision North Top is a mountain in Snowdonia, Wales, near Capel Curig. It is a significant top on the Creigiau Gleision ridge, topping the north end of its crest. Views of Carnedd Llewelyn are better from this summit compared to the main Creigiau Gleision summit, due to less shielding from Pen Llithrig y Wrach.

References

External links
www.geograph.co.uk : photos of Creigiau Gleision and surrounding area

Mountains and hills of Snowdonia
Hewitts of Wales
Nuttalls
Mountains and hills of Conwy County Borough
Trefriw